The Apostolic Nunciature to Latvia is an ecclesiastical office of the Catholic Church in Latvia. It is a diplomatic post of the Holy See, whose representative is called the Apostolic Nuncio with the rank of an ambassador.

Representatives of the Holy See 
Apostolic delegate to the Baltic States
Edward O'Rourke (8 December 1920 - December 1921)
Apostolic delegate
Antonino Zecchini (20 October 1922 - 18 March 1935)
 He became Apostolic Internuncio on 14 April 1926.
Apostolic nuncios
Antonino Arata (12 July 1935 - August 1940)
Justo Mullor García (30 November 1991 - 2 April 1997)
Erwin Josef Ender (9 July 1997 - 19 May 2001)
Peter Stephan Zurbriggen (25 October 2001 - 14 January 2009)
Luigi Bonazzi (25 March 2009 - 18 December 2013)
Pedro López Quintana (22 March 2014 - 4 March 2019)
Petar Rajič (6 August 2019 - present)

See also
Foreign relations of the Holy See
List of diplomatic missions of the Holy See

References

Latvia
 
Holy See–Latvia relations